Ian Michael Bibby (born 20 December 1986) is a British former professional road and cyclo-cross cyclist from England, who rode professionally between 2009 and 2019. He  was the winner of the 2010 British National Cyclo-cross Championships, and the 2015 British National Circuit Race Championships.

He retired at the end of the 2019 season, following the disbandment of his last professional team .

Major results

2009
 3rd National Marathon Championships
2010
 1st  National Cyclo-cross Championships
 1st London Nocturne
 Tour Series
1st Round 3, Portsmouth
1st Round 8, Stoke-on-Trent
 1st Prologue Cinturón a Mallorca
 5th Overall Tour de Bretagne
 8th Overall Vuelta Ciclista a León
2011
 1st Overall Premier Calendar
 1st  Overall Tour of the Reservoir
 3rd Overall Cinturón a Mallorca
1st Stage 3
 5th Road race, National Road Championships
 5th Tour de Mumbai II
 9th London–Surrey Cycle Classic
 10th OCBC Cycle Singapore
2012
 8th Overall Mi-Août Bretonne
1st Stage 2
2013
 2nd Rutland–Melton CiCLE Classic
 10th Trofeo Serra de Tramuntana
2014
 4th Overall An Post Rás
2015
 1st  National Criterium Championships
 1st Chorley Grand Prix
 1st Ryedale Grand Prix
 1st Stage 6 An Post Rás
 6th Overall Bay Classic Series
 6th Beaumont Trophy
2016
 1st Manx International Grand Prix
 1st Wiltshire Gran Prix
 1st Ryedale Grand Prix
 3rd Velothon Wales
 10th Rutland–Melton CiCLE Classic
2017
 1st Overall Bay Classic Series
1st Stage 1
 1st Velothon Wales
 1st Chorley Grand Prix
 1st Lincoln Grand Prix
 2nd Overall Istrian Spring Trophy
 3rd Road race, National Road Championships
 3rd Poreč Trophy
 4th Overall Tour de Korea
2018
 1st Prologue Tour of Japan
 2nd Overall New Zealand Cycle Classic
1st  Points classification
1st Stage 4
 3rd Overall Tour of the Reservoir
1st Stage 1
 6th Overall Tour de Yorkshire
 9th Time trial, Commonwealth Games

References

External links

1986 births
Living people
English male cyclists
Cyclo-cross cyclists
Sportspeople from Preston, Lancashire
Cyclists at the 2018 Commonwealth Games
Commonwealth Games competitors for England